Kamal Mani Dixit (2 September 1929 – 29 December 2016) was the founder and chair of Madan Puraskar Pustakalaya and Madan Puraskar. He was the author of numerous Nepali books and has made important contribution to Nepali literature.

Early life
Dixit was born on 2 September 1929 in Gairidhara, Kathmandu, the son of Kedar Mani Dixit and Bidhya Devi Dixit. Dixit attended Durbar High School in Kathmandu. He graduated with a Bachelor of Arts from Banaras Hindu University in 1949.

Personal life
He married Anju Paudel in 1949. They have 2 sons and 1 daughter: Kunda Dixit and Kanak Mani Dixit are established journalists of Nepal and daughter Rupa Joshi is also known for her writing.

Death
Dixit died on the morning of Thursday, 29 December 2016 at B&B Hospital, Lalitpur. He was suffering from respiratory problem from few days. He was cremated at the electronic crematorium at Pashupati Aryaghat on Thursday morning dressed in daura suruwal and Dhaka topi. After his death Rato Bangala School celebrated his death anniversary each year by reciting the different poems he had written.

See also
Madan Puraskar Pustakalaya
Madan Puraskar
Nepali literature

References

External links

1929 births
2016 deaths
People from Kathmandu
Nepalese male novelists
Nepalese male poets
Banaras Hindu University alumni
Bahun
20th-century Nepalese poets
21st-century Nepalese poets
Durbar High School alumni
Tri-Chandra College alumni